Coahulla Creek High School is a public high school in unincorporated Whitfield County, Georgia, United States. The site has a Dalton postal address. It is in the Whitfield County School District.

The school colors are navy blue and silver, and the mascot is the Colts.  The school is in Class AAA of the Georgia High School Association (GHSA), and is located in Dalton.

History
Coahulla Creek High School opened in August 2011 with 754 students in grades nine through twelve.  In the spring of 2012, CCHS graduated 12 seniors.

Academics
Students can take College Prep (CP), Honors, Advanced Placement (AP), and dual enrollment classes.

Feeder schools
Coahulla Creek High School's feeder school is North Whitfield Middle School.

Athletics
Coahulla Creek fields 21 different varsity level teams (11 men's and 10 women's).
 Men's sports: Archery, baseball, basketball, cross country, football, golf, soccer, swimming, tennis, track and field, and wrestling
 Women's sports: Archery, basketball, competition cheerleading, cross country, golf, soccer, swimming, tennis, track and field, and volleyball

Fine arts
Fine arts at Coahulla Creek consist of choral, band, art, and drama departments.

References

External links
 Coahulla Creek High School

Public high schools in Georgia (U.S. state)
Schools in Whitfield County, Georgia
Educational institutions established in 1975
1975 establishments in Georgia (U.S. state)